Helge Bjørnstad (born 14 October 1971) is a Norwegian ice sledge hockey player.

As a member of the Norwegian ice sledge hockey team he has three silver (1994, 2002, 2006) from the Paralympic Games. At the 1998 Paralympic Games the team took the gold medal. He took the bronze medal with the Norwegian team at the 2010 Winter Paralympics in Vancouver, Canada.

He has also won several Paralympic medals as a swimmer. He took two gold medals and one silver at the 1992 Summer Paralympics, and two gold and one silver at the 1996 Summer Paralympics.

He received the Egebergs Ærespris in 2009, a prize awarded to Norwegian athletes who excel in more than one sport.

References

External links 
 
 

1971 births
Living people
Norwegian sledge hockey players
Paralympic sledge hockey players of Norway
Paralympic gold medalists for Norway
Paralympic silver medalists for Norway
Paralympic bronze medalists for Norway
Swimmers at the 1992 Summer Paralympics
Swimmers at the 1996 Summer Paralympics
Ice sledge hockey players at the 1994 Winter Paralympics
Ice sledge hockey players at the 1998 Winter Paralympics
Ice sledge hockey players at the 2002 Winter Paralympics
Ice sledge hockey players at the 2006 Winter Paralympics
Ice sledge hockey players at the 2010 Winter Paralympics
Medalists at the 1994 Winter Paralympics
Medalists at the 1998 Winter Paralympics
Medalists at the 2002 Winter Paralympics
Medalists at the 2006 Winter Paralympics
Medalists at the 2010 Winter Paralympics
Medalists at the 1992 Summer Paralympics
Medalists at the 1996 Summer Paralympics
Paralympic medalists in sledge hockey
Paralympic medalists in swimming
S9-classified Paralympic swimmers
20th-century Norwegian people
21st-century Norwegian people